The men's Greco-Roman middleweight competition at the 1964 Summer Olympics in Tokyo took place from 16 to 19 October at the Komazawa Gymnasium. Nations were limited to one competitor.

Competition format

This Greco-Roman wrestling competition continued to use the "bad points" elimination system introduced at the 1928 Summer Olympics for Greco-Roman and at the 1932 Summer Olympics for freestyle wrestling, as adjusted at the 1960 Summer Olympics. Each bout awarded 4 points. If the victory was by fall, the winner received 0 and the loser 4. If the victory was by decision, the winner received 1 and the loser 3. If the bout was tied, each wrestler received 2 points. A wrestler who accumulated 6 or more points was eliminated. Rounds continued until there were 3 or fewer uneliminated wrestlers. If only 1 wrestler remained, he received the gold medal. If 2 wrestlers remained, point totals were ignored and they faced each other for gold and silver (if they had already wrestled each other, that result was used). If 3 wrestlers remained, point totals were ignored and a round-robin was held among those 3 to determine medals (with previous head-to-head results, if any, counting for this round-robin).

Results

Round 1

Andhalkar withdrew after his bout.

 Bouts

 Points

Round 2

Five wrestlers were eliminated, leaving 14 to continue on. There was a three-way tie for the lead at 1 point.

 Bouts

 Points

Round 3

Another 5 wrestlers were eliminated, leaving 9 remaining. Simić had the best score at 2 points.

 Bouts

 Points

Round 4

Three wrestlers were eliminated. Simić had a bye and continued to hold the lead at 2 points.

 Bouts

 Points

Round 5

The fifth round eliminated 5 of 6 wrestlers, all but Simić (who thereby won the gold medal). The tie for 4th place was not broken; both men shared that result. The tie for the silver and bronze medals, however, needed to be broken by a head-to-head match in the final round.

 Bouts

 Points

Final round

In a tie-breaker bout to determine the silver and bronze medals, Kormaník defeated Metz by decision.

 Bouts

 Points

References

Wrestling at the 1964 Summer Olympics